Tyee High School, formerly Tyee Educational Complex, is a public high school campus located in SeaTac, Washington, United States. It was founded as Tyee High School, a single public high school, in 1962. It is operated by the Highline School District.

Starting in the 2005–2006 academic year, it was split from a single school into three smaller high schools. In 2011 it was turned into two small schools now known as Academy of Citizenship and Empowerment and Global Connections High School as a part of the small schools movement. It is also a member of the Coalition of Essential Schools.

History 
In 1963, Tyee High School was founded as a part of the Highline School District to serve an area between Burien and Des Moines in the west, and Tukwila in the east, which would later become the city of SeaTac.

In 1993, one of Tyee's distinguished teachers was recognized by the state of Washington for building an observatory on school grounds, one of the few in the nation at the time, with the State's Golden Apple award.

Small schools conversion 
In the years prior to the conversion, Tyee suffered from severe discipline and academic performance issues. New principal Max Silverman and the district's deputy superintendent, John Welch, knew that change was necessary and began to talk about how to improve the situation. In 2003, the school received a grant from the Discuren Foundation to begin research.

Over the next several years, Silverman and Welch led the research, including traveling to other high schools across the nation to note what made such schools successful. This research led the staff to decide that a small schools approach was the best way to improve the school's standing. In the 2004–2005 school year, the school instituted freshman "houses" intended to give incoming students more personalized instruction. The staff noted significant improvements, which support the idea of small, autonomous schools.

In 2004, Tyee received a large grant from the Coalition of Essential Schools to be used in the conversion process. In addition, they, along with the district's other three schools, received a Department of Education Small Learning Community grant. In 2005 the Bill & Melinda Gates Foundation awarded a grant to the district, a significant portion of which went towards Tyee.

Beginning in the 2005–2006 school year, Tyee ceased to operate as a single comprehensive high school and was split into the three small schools, as noted above. However, it was still recognized by the state as a single school, and thus its graduates received Tyee High School diplomas, and WASL scores were reported only for Tyee as a whole. The schools first held individual graduation ceremonies in 2007. In the same year, WASL scores were reported individually for each school.

About the school 
Tyee high school is diverse in culture and language among its student population. The enrollment rate of minorities are 90%, which is almost all students that are enrolled and 81% of those students are economically disadvantaged. This school has an average of 981 students enrolled every year. Tyee is also ranked 231st out of 300 in Washington State.
As other high schools, Tyee provides students with Advanced Placement exams for students who wants to challenge themself and be prepared for college while they're in High school.

Enrollment 
In the years preceding the conversion, Tyee's enrollment was at just above 834 students. As a condition of the Coalition of Essential Schools grant, the small schools were to each have no more than 400 students, resulting in the complex's total enrollment being closer to 1100. In the first two years of having small schools, students were not allowed to enroll in a specific school. Instead, being placed into one of the three depending on various factors. Beginning in the 2007–2008 school year, students were allowed to enroll in the school of their choice.

In 2020–2021, Tyee's enrollment number is 834. In detail, out of the 834 students, 0.6% were American Indians, 17% were Asian, 20.1% were Black/African Americans, 43% were Hispanic or Latino of any race, 7.9% were White, 4.2% were mixed with two or more races.

Tyee DECA 
In 2017, eleven students from DECA qualified for international competitions. Since Tyee is near the Airport, Alaska Airline donated four round-trip tickets to support students. AT&T also supported Tyee DECA students by donating almost $10,000 to help students succeed.

Staff diversity 
According to Crosscut "White educators made up approximately 88% of classroom teachers during the 2018-19 year." In the Washington State. However, the population of students of color is approximately 47% of the population. Even though Tyee has become very diverse in race and culture students-wise, the majority of teachers have remained white. As reported by, Washington Office of Superintendent of Public Instruction that 66.1% of Tyee educators remain White. However, the population of students of color at Tyee remains relatively lower than the population of white educators.

School facilities 

The complex consists of several small circular buildings, as well as two larger buildings. As Tyee initially existed as a single school, adjusting to three small schools has been difficult. The cafeteria (100), library (500), gymnasiums, locker rooms (part of 700 building), and clinic (900) are operated by the complex and are shared equally by all three schools. In addition, the 200 building, which contains science equipment which cannot easily be moved, is shared by the three schools; however, unlike the other buildings, each school is responsible for different rooms of the building.

Other parts of the complex are occupied by individual schools. Global Connections occupies the 300 and 600 buildings on the east side of the complex. ACE occupies the classrooms of the 700 building, which excludes portions operated by the complex, such as the gymnasiums. Odyssey occupies the 800 building, a large building at the top of the hill on the western side of the complex. This building was once part of neighboring Chinook Middle School, but since the 1981–1982 school year, it has been used by Tyee, and eventually Odyssey.

Levenhagen Observatory 
The Levenhagen Observatory  is an astronomical observatory owned and operated by Tyee High School. It is named after Physics/Astronomy teacher Warren Levenhagen.

Extracurricular activities

Sports 
Athletics are one of the few areas in which all three schools remain combined, as it is unlikely that any of the individual schools would have the ability to field a full team in any event. The sports teams are called the Totems, after the traditional Native American totem poles. The complex as a whole fields varsity teams in football, cross country, soccer, volleyball, swimming, basketball, gymnastics, wrestling, baseball, fastpitch, tennis, and track and field. Football currently co-ops to Mount Rainier and play as the Rams.

Tyee's sports teams are members of the Sound Division of the South Puget Sound League (2A) as of the 2016–2017 school year.

Tyee has earned three state championships in its history, in cross country in 1975 and 1976, and girls' soccer in 1984.

Famous alumni 
 Adam Smith (politician), Democratic member of the United States House of Representatives since 1997.
 Gary Ridgway, serial killer and necrophile, known to have killed at least 49 women and teenaged girls.
 Steve Pool, weather anchor for KOMO-TV in Seattle.
 Stacy Rost, Writer and host for 710 ESPN Seattle

See also

References

External links 

 Tyee High School

Wikipedia Student Program
Public high schools in Washington (state)
Schools in King County, Washington
SeaTac, Washington